Serrated Smile is the third studio album by the industrial/techno band G.G.F.H.  It was originally released on Halloween 2005 as a limited edition CD of 500 copies, but was later made available to the public for download through Ghost’s website. The album is darker and more beat-driven compared to previously released material, as the original guitarist, Brian J. Walls, had left the band, resulting in a change of sound. The album was originally to be released on Earache Records, but that did not work out, and it was instead self released on Little Missy Recordings.

Track listing

 "Intro" (3:16)
 "Serrated Smile" (4:22)
 "Skarz" (5:41)
 "Genosside" (4:48)
 "Mobilemethlab (MML)" (5:42)
 "High Way" (1:02)
 "Konform" (4:36)
 "Guilty" (6:05)
 "Grinder" (5:31)
 "2Haven2Hold" (4:39)
 "Hungry" (3:30)
 "Bull*Hit" (5:44)
 "Nineoneone" (3:14)
 "Stay Sick..." (0:11)
 "W.O.T. End" (20:00)

Personnel
Ghost (Michael Geist) - Vocals/Programming

References

2005 albums
G.G.F.H. albums